Spirillaceae is a family in the order Nitrosomonadales in the class Betaproteobacteria of the bacteria.

Only one genus, Spirillum, has been described in this family.

References

Nitrosomonadales